Giovanni Folcarelli (May 30, 1926 – May 26, 1982) was the Lieutenant Governor of the U.S. State of Rhode Island from 1965 to 1967. He was a Democrat. Folcarelli attended Boston College and earned an LL.B. degree. He also served in World War II in the United States Army Air Forces from 1944 to 1946.

References

1926 births
1982 deaths
Rhode Island Democrats